Phú Mỹ Hưng urban area is a new urban area in District 7, Ho Chi Minh City. The area is managed by the Phu My Hung Development Corporation.

On June 26, 2008, the Ministry of Construction and the People's Committee of Ho Chi Minh City recognized Phú Mỹ Hưng urban area as a "model urban area" of Vietnam.

Location 
Phú Mỹ Hưng is located along Nguyễn Văn Linh Boulevard, an arterial route through District 7.

References 

Populated places in Ho Chi Minh City